Silesian Institute (Polish: Instytut Śląski) may refer to:

 Silesian Institute in Katowice (Instytut Śląski w Katowicach), a regional scientific organization
 Silesian Institute in Opole (Instytut Śląski w Opolu)